The ‘’'Violin Sonata’'’ No. 4 (also known as the “Duo” or “Grand Duo”) in A major, Op. posth. 162,  574, for violin and piano by Franz Schubert was composed in 1817. This sonata, composed one year after his first three sonatas for the same instruments, was a much more individual work, showing neither the influence of Mozart, as in these previous works, nor of Rossini, as in the contemporaneous 6th Symphony.

Structure
The Sonata has four movements:

’'Allegro moderato’' (A major), sonata form
’'Scherzo: presto’' (E major), with C major trio
’'Andantino’' (C major), loose ternary form
’'Allegro vivace’' (A major), sonata form

Reception

References

Sources

External links
 

Chamber music by Franz Schubert
Schubert, D 574
Schubert
Compositions in A major
Compositions by Franz Schubert published posthumously